Aksai may refer to:
Aksai County, an autonomous county in Gansu Province, People's Republic of China
Aksai Chin, region located at the juncture of China, India and Pakistan